De Jagers Pass is situated in the Western Cape province of South Africa, off-road, near Beaufort West.

References

 

Mountain passes of the Western Cape